Stephen Billington (born 10 December 1964) is an English actor, best known for playing Greg Kelly in Coronation Street (for which he won the 1999 British Soap Award for Villain of the Year).

Career

Born in Farnworth, Lancashire, Billington trained at the Drama Centre London, and was an unknown when chosen from hundreds who auditioned to play the lead part of Lysander Hawkley in The Man Who Made Husbands Jealous (1997). He has gone on to work with many leading film directors, including Peter Greenaway, Franco Zeffirelli, and Mel Gibson. He also now teaches at the London School of Dramatic Art, the Drama Centre London, the Method Studio, London, and the City Literary Institute.

In 2011 he took to the stage to play John Proctor in Arthur Miller's The Crucible at the York Theatre Royal. In 2013, he joined the cast of Channel 4 soap opera, Hollyoaks playing Danny Lomax.

Filmography

Accolades

References

External links

 

1964 births
Living people
English male film actors
English male television actors
Alumni of the Drama Centre London
People from Farnworth
Actors from Lancashire